Patryk Lipski (born 12 June 1994) is a Polish professional footballer who plays as a midfielder for Polish side Widzew Łódź.

Career
Lipski started his career with Ruch Chorzów. On 12 August 2017, Lipski agreed a deal to join Lechia Gdańsk. In August 2020, he became a player of Piast Gliwice, and he left the club by mutual consent at the end of February 2022.

Shortly after, on 3 March 2022, Lipski joined I liga club Widzew Łódź on a year-and-a-half contract.

Career statistics

Club

Honours
Lechia Gdańsk
 Polish Cup: 2018–19
 Polish Super Cup: 2019

References

External links
 

1994 births
Living people
Association football midfielders
Polish footballers
Poland under-21 international footballers
Ruch Chorzów players
Lechia Gdańsk players
Piast Gliwice players
Widzew Łódź players
Ekstraklasa players
I liga players
Sportspeople from Szczecin